Jussi Timonen (born June 29, 1983) is a Finnish professional ice hockey defenceman who is currently an unrestricted free agent. He most recently played for the Schwenninger Wild Wings of the Deutsche Eishockey Liga (DEL). He is the younger brother former NHL'er Kimmo Timonen.

Playing career
Timonen began playing hockey at the junior level for KalPa, the team owned by brother Kimmo Timonen and Sami Kapanen. After two years with the team, he was drafted by the Philadelphia Flyers in the fifth round, 146th overall, of the 2001 NHL Entry Draft. He has since played for two other SM-liiga teams, TPS and SaiPa.

On May 30, 2006, the Flyers announced that they had signed Timonen to a two-year entry-level contract. "I am very happy because this has been my dream all my life," said Timonen. "I talked to my brother a little bit about the NHL and he gave me some tips, but we will talk more on this later. I think my skating is pretty good. That is my main strength."

Following Flyers training camp, he was sent down to the Philadelphia Phantoms, the AHL affiliate of the Flyers. He was called up and made his NHL debut on November 20 against the Pittsburgh Penguins.

On December 10, 2007, Timonen was traded to the Dallas Stars in return for a conditional draft pick where he was placed with the team's AHL affiliate, the Iowa Stars. Following the season, Timonen returned to Finland to play for KalPa. On December 12, 2012, Timonen was signed to a four-year contract extension to remain with KalPa.

After playing nine seasons with KalPa, captaining the club for two years, Timonen left as a free agent following the 2016–17 season. He agreed to continue his career in Germany, signing an initial one-year contract with the Schwenninger Wild Wings of the DEL on May 7, 2017.

Timonen played two seasons with the Wild Wings, before leaving the club at the conclusion of the 2018–19 season.

Career statistics

Regular season and playoffs

International

References

External links
 

1983 births
Finnish ice hockey defencemen
Iowa Stars players
KalPa players
Living people
Mikkelin Jukurit players
People from Kuopio
Philadelphia Flyers draft picks
Philadelphia Flyers players
Philadelphia Phantoms players
SaiPa players
Schwenninger Wild Wings players
HC TPS players
TuTo players
Sportspeople from North Savo